Buckatunna is a census-designated place (CDP) and unincorporated community located in Wayne County, Mississippi, United States. The population was 383 at the 2020 census. Buckatunna is located in the southeast corner of Wayne County, just west of the Alabama state line. Buckatunna has a post office with the zip code 39322.

The community takes its name from nearby Buckatunna Creek.

Buckatunna is the hometown of professional football player Jerrell Powe.

Demographics 

As of the 2020 United States census, there were 383 people, 97 households, and 97 families residing in the CDP.

References

Unincorporated communities in Wayne County, Mississippi
Unincorporated communities in Mississippi
Census-designated places in Wayne County, Mississippi
Census-designated places in Mississippi
Mississippi placenames of Native American origin